|}

The Craddockstown Novice Chase is a Grade 2 National Hunt novice steeplechase in Ireland which is open to horses aged four years or older. It is run at Punchestown over a distance of about 2 miles (2 miles and 40 yards, or 3,255 metres), and it is scheduled to take place each year in November.

The race was first run in 1995.  For a period the event was classed at Grade 3 level. It was promoted to Grade 2 status in 2003.

Records
<div style="font-size:90%">
Leading jockey since 1995 (3 wins):
 Paul Carberry - Sir Oj (2004), Northern Alliance (2008), Chancol (2014)
 Andrew Lynch – Blueberry Boy (2006), Sizing Europe (2009), Days Hotel (2011) Leading trainer since 1995 (5 wins):
 Henry de Bromhead – Sizing Europe (2009), 	Days Hotel (2011), Sizing John (2015), Identity Thief (2016), 	Notebook (2019)</div>

Winners

See also
 Horse racing in Ireland
 List of Irish National Hunt races

References
 Racing Post:

 pedigreequery.com – Craddockstown Novice Chase – Punchestown.''

National Hunt races in Ireland
National Hunt chases
Punchestown Racecourse